The Marquis  (1859 – October 1886) was a British Thoroughbred racehorse. After retiring from racing he became a successful stallion in Australia.

Background
The Marquis was a bay colt foaled in 1859 and sired by Stockwell. His dam was Cinizelli, a daughter of Touchstone, who had previously produced The Oaks winner Marchioness. He was trained in Yorkshire by John Scott. He appears to have been a temperamental colt who wore blinkers and was usually accompanied to the start by his stable lad, who held onto his head until the last moment.

Racing career
The Marquis won the Champagne Stakes at Doncaster Racecourse and the Prendergast Stakes at Newmarket as a two-year-old in 1861. In the spring of 1862 he won the 2,000 Guineas Stakes, beating Caterer by half a length. After the race he was surrounded by his Yorkshire supporters, some of whom narrowly escaped injury when he kicked out. He started favourite for The Derby and led for most of the way before being overtaken in the closing stages and beaten a neck by the outsider Caractacus. His jockey, Tom Ashmall, who had ridden the colt to victory in the Guineas, was criticised for going to the front too soon. Tom Challoner took over the ride when The Marquis started second favourite for the St. Leger Stakes on 18 September. He was not among the early leaders but moved to the front on the turn into the straight. Throughout the closing stages he was strongly challenged by the favourite Buckstone, and looked beaten at one point before rallying in the final strides to win by a head.

Stud career
As a four-year-old, The Marquis was sold to Russian interests but spent most of his stud career in Australia. The Marquis died in October 1886 at the Bundoora Park Stud in Melbourne.

Pedigree

References

1859 racehorse births
1886 racehorse deaths
Racehorses bred in the United Kingdom
Racehorses trained in the United Kingdom
Thoroughbred family 2-b
2000 Guineas winners
St Leger winners